Cathedral of Córdoba may refer to:
 Cathedral of Córdoba (Argentina), a Roman Catholic cathedral in Argentina
 Mosque–Cathedral of Córdoba, a Roman Catholic cathedral in Spain